"Oh Darlin' (Why Don't You Care for Me No More)" is a debut song written and recorded by American country music duo The O'Kanes.  It was released in September 1986 as the first single from the album The O'Kanes.  The song reached #10 on the Billboard Hot Country Singles & Tracks chart.

Chart performance

References

1986 debut singles
1986 songs
The O'Kanes songs
Songs written by Kieran Kane
Songs written by Jamie O'Hara (singer)
columbia Records singles